The 1996–97 Division 1 season was the 59th since its establishment. AS Monaco won the French Association Football League with 79 points. Four teams were relegated to Second division and only two were promoted because in 1997–1998, only 18 would participate the championship.

Participating teams

 Auxerre
 Bastia
 Bordeaux
 SM Caen
 AS Cannes
 EA Guingamp
 Le Havre AC
 RC Lens
 Lille OSC
 Olympique Lyonnais
 Olympique de Marseille
 FC Metz
 AS Monaco
 Montpellier HSC
 AS Nancy
 FC Nantes Atlantique
 OGC Nice
 Paris Saint-Germain FC
 Stade Rennais FC
 RC Strasbourg

League table

Promoted from Ligue 2, who will play in Division 1 season 1997/1998
 LB Châteauroux : champion of Ligue 2
 Toulouse FC : runners-up

Results

Top goalscorers

References

External links
France 1996/97 at Rec.Sport.Soccer Statistics Foundation

Ligue 1 seasons
France
1